Aliso Village was a housing project in Los Angeles, California. It was built in 1942 and demolished 1999. The  parcel was replaced by Pueblo del Sol.

The complex was owned and managed by the Housing Authority of the City of Los Angeles.

History
Aliso Village was one of the most impoverished areas of the city, and by the 1930s was considered one of the last remaining slums in the United States. Reformer Jacob Riis had visited The Flats in 1905 and 1908 and reported that the slums are worst in country and rents are higher. A survey conducted by the city in the 1937 deemed 20% of the city's dwellings "unfit for human habitation," including most of The Flats. During World War II, the Housing Authority of the City of Los Angeles (HACLA) razed The Flats and built Aliso Village projects in their place. The landscaping was by the firm of Bashford and Barlow. Like most of HACLA's 1940s projects, the Aliso Village projects were hailed at the time of their construction as some of the finest examples of the principles espoused by the garden city movement, and were racially integrated to boot.

Soon after the end the war, Aliso Village lost most of their non-Latino populations, and were increasingly populated by Mexican immigrants. With the river on one side and a massive rail yard on another, the construction of the East Los Angeles Interchange further isolated them from the rest of the city, and the closure of the Pacific Electric Railway dramatically reduced the mobility of many of the projects' residents. By the 1970s, overcrowding had eliminated much of Aliso Village's once-vaunted green spaces, physical deterioration had become rampant, and gangs were an increasing problem. In the 1980s the residents of Aliso Village began to organize with the support of Dolores Mission Church and its community organization, UNO, and began to address these problems. By the late eighties the residents of the two housing projects had developed a network of community groups that pushed for better services and began negotiating truces between the different gangs, thus reducing the level of violence. In 1996, HACLA wrote off the projects, against the residents desires'.  In 2000 Aliso Village was demolished and replaced with the New Urbanist, Pueblo del Sol "workforce housing" project. In the process two thirds of the residents of the housing projects were displaced in a situation reminiscent of the Chavez Ravine incident.

Crime/Gang Activity
Aliso Village had a very high crime and poverty rate in the 80's and 90's. In addition to a number of gangs that carved out territory in the complex from the 1940s to the 1990s. Such gangs being the 1st East Coast Crips (active), Primera Flats 13, The Mob Crew 13, Al Capone 13 (inactive), Cuatro Flats 13, East Los Angeles 13 (inactive) and Aliso Village Brims/Bloods (extinct).

Schools
Utah Street Elementary school was located at the center of the Aliso Village projects.  Utah Street school was mainly attended by Aliso Village residents.

Pico Aliso and Pico residents had to walk up the hill to Second Street Elementary School.

Notable residents
Sam Balter - basketball, 1936 Summer Olympics
Felipe Esparza, stand-up comedian and actor
Mike Garrett - football, won 1965 Heisman Trophy
Paul Gonzales - boxer, 1984 Summer Olympics
Daniel Ramos - Graffiti tagger, known for tagging "CHAKA"
Sylvester - disco singer, most notable for "You Make Me Feel (Mighty Real)" and "Dance (Disco Heat)".

References

External links
Utah Street Elementary Home Page
Second Street Elementary Home Page
David Miranda Photography Home Page
Photograph of site for Aliso Village housing project, Housing Authority of the City of Los Angeles, 1941 September 5

Public housing in Los Angeles
Boyle Heights, Los Angeles
Demolished buildings and structures in Los Angeles